Wolfgang Kieber (born 22 July 1984) is an international retired footballer from Liechtenstein who played as a midfielder.

External links

1984 births
Living people
Liechtenstein footballers
Liechtenstein international footballers
Austrian footballers
Austrian people of Liechtenstein descent
People with acquired Liechtenstein citizenship
FC Balzers players
Association football midfielders
People from Feldkirch, Vorarlberg
Footballers from Vorarlberg